Narratophilia is a sexual fetish in which words and stories are sexually arousing, usually by the telling of dirty and obscene words or stories to a partner. For some people, writings or words that are not outright obscene can have the same arousal effect.  The term is also used for arousal by means of listening to obscene words and stories.

References

Sexual fetishism